Reecha is a given name. Notable people with the name include:
Reecha Sinha, Indian actress
Reecha Sharma, Nepalese film actress and model

See also
Richa